The 2017 Derry Senior Hurling Championship was the 72st edition of the Derry GAA's premier hurling tournament for senior clubs in Derry. The winners receive the Fr Collins Cup.

Slaughtneil Robert Emmet's were the defending champions, having beaten Banagher in the 2016 final 2–19 to 1–12.

Quarter-finals

Semi-finals

Final

Ulster Senior Club Hurling Championship

Derry
Derry Senior Hurling Championship